Megachile armaticeps is a species of bee in the family Megachilidae. It was described by Cresson in 1869.

References

Armaticeps
Insects described in 1869